Milena Šoltészová (born 28 November 1939) is a Czech printmaker.

Later she took a course in art restoration as well. She joined the artists' organization Hollar in 1991. She has been active as an illustrator as well as printmaker, and favors mainly gravure techniques such as etching, aquatint, and drypoint.

A print by Šoltészová from 1990, Dve lahve/Two Bottles in drypoint and aquatint in blue and black on wove paper, is owned by the National Gallery of Art.

References

1939 births
Living people
Czech printmakers
Women printmakers
20th-century Czech artists
20th-century Czech printmakers
20th-century Czech women artists
21st-century Czech artists
21st-century printmakers
21st-century Czech women artists
Artists from Prague
Academy of Fine Arts, Prague alumni